Atle may refer to:

Atle (given name), a Norwegian given name
Atle-class icebreakers, a class of Finnish and Swedish icebreakers
Atle (1974 icebreaker), the lead ship of her class
Atle-Tiba, one of the most traditional derbies in Brazilian football

See also
Mieszki-Atle, a village in Ciechanów County, Masovian Voivodeship, Poland